The 2003 Royal Bank Cup was the 33rd Junior "A" 2003 ice hockey National Championship for the Canadian Junior A Hockey League.

The Royal Bank Cup was competed for by the winners of the Doyle Cup, Anavet Cup, Dudley Hewitt Cup, the Fred Page Cup and a host city.

The tournament was hosted by the Charlottetown Abbies in Charlottetown, Prince Edward Island.

The playoffs

Round robin

Results
Lennoxville Cougars defeat Charlottetown Abbies 5-4 in Overtime
Humboldt Broncos defeat Wellington Dukes 4-1
Charlottetown Abbies defeat Camrose Kodiaks 3-2
Lennoxville Cougars defeat Humboldt Broncos 5-4 in Overtime
Camrose Kodiaks defeat Wellington Dukes 7-1
Wellington Dukes defeat Charlottetown Abbies 1-0 in Overtime
Camrose Kodiaks defeat Lennoxville Cougars 4-1
Humboldt Broncos defeat Charlottetown Abbies 8-5
Wellington Dukes defeat Lennoxville Cougars 5-2
Camrose Kodiaks defeat Humboldt Broncos 5-3

Semi and finals

Awards
Most Valuable Player: Craig Olynick (Humboldt Broncos)
Top Scorer: Josh Podaima (Humboldt Broncos)
Most Sporsmanlike Player: Travis Friedley (Camrose Kodiaks)
Top Goalie: Mike Brodeur (Camrose Kodiaks)
Top Forward: Carl Gagnon (Lennoxville Cougars)
Top Defenceman: Craig Olynick (Humboldt Broncos)

Roll of League Champions
AJHL: Camrose Kodiaks
BCHL: Vernon Vipers
CJHL: Nepean Raiders
MJHL: OCN Blizzard
MJAHL: Charlottetown Abbies
NOJHL: North Bay Skyhawks
OPJHL: Wellington Dukes
QJAAAHL: Lennoxville Cougars
SJHL: Humboldt Broncos
SIJHL: Fort Frances Borderland Thunder

See also
Canadian Junior A Hockey League
Royal Bank Cup
Anavet Cup
Doyle Cup
Dudley Hewitt Cup
Fred Page Cup

External links
Royal Bank Cup Website

2003
Royal Bank Cup
Royal Bank Cup
Royal Bank